Ge Xuan (164–244), courtesy name Xiaoxian, was a Chinese Taoist practitioner who lived in the Eastern Han dynasty (25–220) and Three Kingdoms period (220–280) of China. He was the ancestor of Ge Hong and a resident of Danyang Commandery in the state of Eastern Wu during the Three Kingdoms period. Ge Xuan's paternal grandnephew, Ge Hong, gave him the title "Ge Xuan Gong", which translates into "Immortal Lord" or "Transcendent Duke". Ge Hong wrote about his great uncle at length and claimed that some alchemical texts from the Baopuzi originally came from him. Ge Xuan is also portrayed by his descendant Ge Chaofu as having been the first recipient of the Lingbao sacred scriptures. He is remembered as a mythological member of the Chinese Ge family and a prominent figure in early Taoism development.

Early life
Ge Xuan was a legendary figure who was associated with various Taoist traditions. He belonged to a family of great official status and was considered intelligent since birth. During his early childhood, Ge Xuan was depicted as an inquisitive learner as he read several books, such as the Confucian classics (and commentaries), plus numerous other philosophical and historical records. Due to his keen fascination for the philosophies of Laozi and Zhuangzi, he attained a great deal of spiritual wisdom about how the Dao worked in daily life. Consequently, at age 16, Ge Xuan obtained great fame on the northern banks of the Yangtze River.

Ge Xuan's parents died while he was an adolescent. In effect, this initiated his obsession with the study of the Dao and the ways in which life works. Ge Xuan's pursuits led him to live in utter isolation in areas such as mountains and forests. This secluded environment allowed Ge Xuan to strictly discipline himself mentally, spiritually, and physically. The Dao requires intense discipline for its followers because the focal purpose is to achieve longevity or, even better, immortality. Ge Xuan visited places like Lingyue Mountain, Chicheng Mountain, and Luofu Mountain. Furthermore, he also visited extraordinary individuals, ate Ganoderma lucidum (a type of mushroom), setose thistle (Cirsium setosum), and relentlessly tried to engross himself in self-cultivation.

Upon encountering the Immortal Zuo Ci, Ge Xuan obtained various mythological scriptures such as the Immortals' Book of Liquefied Gold of the Nine Elixirs. When he received this scripture, Ge Xuan incessantly practiced the art of fasting and abided by the commandments that were laid down by the Ultimate. This subservience enabled him to meander through mountains and seas, thereby constructing many selves and altering forms. The spiritual capability of ling also assisted Ge Xuan in implementing exorcisms and restoring the ill. This marked the start of his professional career, in which he tried ailing the sick by offering magical potions that ultimately resulted in immortality. This pleased the gods, which allowed Zuo Ci, the 'Perfect Man of the Ultimate', to descend to the Tiantai Mountain and pass on more scriptures; namely the Numinous Treasure (36 volumes).

Professional career
Ge Xuan's grandnephew Ge Hong, a renowned alchemist who wrote the Baopuzi, also wrote a thorough biography about Ge Xuan in the Biographies of Divine Immortals (Shenxian Zhuan). In this biography, Ge Hong states that Ge Xuan was summoned to the court of the Eastern Wu ruler, Sun Quan. However, a flotilla of boats capsized, causing numerous deaths. Many presumed that Ge Xuan was one of the casualties, but Ge Xuan miraculously returned a few days later, apologizing for not being present. Ge Xuan excused himself by claiming he had been detained by the water deity, Wu Zixu. Ge Xuan was able to stay submerged by holding his breath for a lengthy period of time due to a mastery of "embryonic breathing" and his legendary faculty to manipulate the wind, the rain, and the rivers.

Many Mahayana Buddhists deem Ge Xuan to be one of Daoism's founders, along with Zhang Daoling. Ge Hong stated that Ge Xuan was a member of the lineage of alchemical texts, including Scripture of Great Clarity (Taiqing Jing), Scripture of the Nine Elixirs (Jiudan Jing), and Scripture of the Golden Fluid (Jinye Jing), which he transmitted to Ge Hong, although Ge Xuan did not concoct any elixirs himself. According to Ge Chaofu, Ge Hong's grandnephew, Ge Xuan was also the person who received the Lingbao scriptures directly from the deities. Ge Xuan's descendants gave him the title of the "Transcendent Duke of the Left of the Great Ultimate" because of his beliefs. Ge Xuan remained an imperative figure in Daoism until the Middle Ages, receiving many posthumous titles bestowed upon him by the emperor.

Retirement

Ge Xuan became a distinctive "Master of Esoterica", excelling at breathing exercises. These exercises were dependent on a particular diet that avoided consuming grains and alcohol. There are numerous unearthly tales in the hagiographical life of Ge Xuan. The most common legends include his supernatural gifts. For example, Ge Xuan could replace his body. Often during his hosted parties, he would talk with some of his guests and welcome or send others off at the same time. Ge Xuan also purportedly had the gift of telekinesis. He could point at an object and cause it to move or disappear and even cause unseen objects to appear. At one particular party, the drinking cups arrived and filled themselves with liquor. Additionally, Ge Xuan had the talent to hover three or four feet above ground and saunter in the air.

In later life, one of Ge Xuan's responsibilities was to regale the Emperor. When he grew tired of this, Ge Xuan informed his disciple Zhang Gong that he was arranging to leave the mortal world at noon on August 11. Ge Xuan primed himself for transcendence by dressing up in his finest clothing and lying down on his bed. After some time, Zhang Gong saw that his master still had color on his face but was no longer breathing. Over the next three days and nights, Zhang Gong proceeded with the vital after-death rituals. However, at midnight on the third night, a mighty wind blew through Ge Xuan's room and snuffed out the candles. When the candles were relit, Ge Xuan's human body had disappeared, leaving only his clothes with the waistband still tied around them. The next day, it was discovered that the mighty wind had only blown through Ge Xuan's room and not through any of the neighboring houses.

Literary contributions

Classic of Purity 

One of Ge Xuan's literary contributions was the Classic of Purity (Qingjing Jing), in which he wrote that "the Inner Spirit of people loves purity, but the mind of people is often rebellious". The reason why people do not possess the competence to achieve this is because their minds are not clear and their desires are unrestrained. Ge Xuan wrote that desires are what bind individuals to become selfish and dishonest. Furthermore, he also wrote that our mind creates illusions which make us suffer throughout life. Ge Xuan stated that if we want to gain control of ourselves, we must first control our wandering mind.

Other texts 
The Immortal Lord Ge Xuan received texts from Zuo Yuanfang, who himself received them from a divine man that came to him while he was devoting himself to the practices of the purification of thought on Mount Tianzhu. Then Ge Xuan passed the Book of The Nine Elixirs to his great-nephew Ge Hong. The Lingbao account for Ge Xuan endured, in which an anonymous preface written during the Six Dynasties' period to the Heshang Gong annotated version of the Dao De Jing, the "Preface and Secret Instructions" are attributed to him. According to the Biography of Transcendent Duke Ge of the Great Ultimate, composed by Zhu Chuo in 1377, almost all revealed literature in early Daoism might be retraced to Ge Xuan. However, Ge Xuan was thought to have become immortal after his body vanished.

Ge Xuan was recognized as the true Supreme Immortal when his scripts were passed on to his great-nephew Ge Hong. Although Ge Hong began composing the Classic of the Sacred Jewel (Lingbao Jing) in about 379 CE, he claimed that they had been first revealed to his own ancestor, Ge Xuan. Ge Xuan wrote a book in which his notions are uncovered. Furthermore, in Daoism, Ge Xuan is called "the Perfect Sovereign and Protector" in correspondence with the eternal Dao. In addition, common individuals address him as the "Immortal Elder Ge of the Supreme Ultimate". Ge Xuan's scripts were given recognition because of his nephew's success in writing.

Overall significance
Ge Xuan's significance can be directly attributed to the Lingbao school, which was founded by Ge Chaofu, the grand nephew of Ge Hong. While this school contained dissolved teachings, which were handed down to Ge Hong and in turn to Ge Chaofu, both of these figures are important in the history of Daoism today. Ge Xuan's life was dedicated to reading and following the various scriptures handed to him from various spirits after his parents passed when he was 16. Ge Xuan is known for many other feats, as he was an accomplished alchemist. He had many gifts, such as mind control, the power to levitate, heal the sick, and also the ability to exorcize evil spirits. Ge Xuan would occasionally use these gifts to entertain at various social events. Throughout history, he received many names and titles, often denoting his beliefs or skill sets. Ge Xuan finally achieved immortality in true style, disappearing in the night with a gust of wind leaving only two things: the clothes he was wearing and enough legend to last many centuries.

See also
Lists of people of the Three Kingdoms

Notes

References

Bibliography

 
 
 
 
 
 
 
 
 
 Sheng, Jiang. "Ge Xuan (Immortal Elder Ge)." Taoist Culture and Information Centre. Retrieved 25 Oct. 2008. http://eng.taoism.org.hk/general-daoism/eminent-philosophers-accomplished-daoists/pg1-4-9.htm 
 Xuan, Ge. "The Classic of Purity." The Classic of Purity. Retrieved 23 Oct. 2008 http://www.theosophical.ca/ClassicPurity.htm

External links 
 

164 births
244 deaths
Chinese religious leaders
Eastern Wu Taoists